Lucas Javier Acevedo (born 8 November 1991) is an Argentine professional footballer who plays as a centre-back for Colón.

Career
Acevedo's career started with Newell's Old Boys in 2008, but he left a year later before eventually joining Tiro Federal. He featured for their senior squad during the 2012–13 Torneo Argentino A season prior to signing for Rosario Central of the Argentine Primera División. After being an unused substitute three times in 2013–14, Acevedo made his professional debut in the following campaign of 2014 during a draw with Quilmes; which was followed by his first goal against San Lorenzo two games later. He ended 2014 with two goals in twelve matches in all competitions for Rosario Central under Miguel Ángel Russo.

In January 2015, fellow Primera División side Nueva Chicago loaned Acevedo. He was subsequently selected six times. 2016 saw Acevedo have loan spells with Estudiantes and Ferro Carril Oeste in Primera B Nacional. He followed one goal in twenty-one fixtures for Estudiantes in 2016 with one in nine for Ferro Carril Oeste in 2016–17. A loan move to Santamarina was completed on 21 February 2017. Five months later, Acevedo joined San Martín on a two-year loan. They were promoted in 2017–18, with his last appearance coming versus Sarmiento on 3 June 2018; San Martín won 5–1 as Acevedo scored two.

San Martín signed Acevedo permanently ahead of the 2018–19 Argentine Primera División season. Ahead of the 2019/20 season, Acevedo joined Club Atlético Colón.

Career statistics
.

References

External links

1991 births
Living people
Sportspeople from Córdoba Province, Argentina
Argentine footballers
Argentine expatriate footballers
Association football defenders
Torneo Argentino A players
Argentine Primera División players
Primera Nacional players
Chilean Primera División players
Tiro Federal footballers
Rosario Central footballers
Nueva Chicago footballers
Club Sportivo Estudiantes players
Ferro Carril Oeste footballers
Club y Biblioteca Ramón Santamarina footballers
San Martín de Tucumán footballers
Club Atlético Colón footballers
Club Deportivo Palestino footballers
Club Atlético Platense footballers
Argentine expatriate sportspeople in Chile
Expatriate footballers in Chile